JCO Clinical Cancer Informatics is an online peer-reviewed medical journal of oncology and medical informatics published by Lippincott Williams & Wilkins. The journal was established in 2017 and the editor-in-chief is Debra A. Patt (Texas Oncology).
Articles are published upon acceptance and after 12 months become freely available. All ASCO special articles (e.g. clinical guidelines and policy statements), editorials, comments and controversies articles, and correspondence are freely available immediately upon publication.

Abstracting and indexing
This journal is abstracted and indexed in:
Emerging Sources Citation Index
Index Medicus/MEDLINE/PubMed
Scopus

See also
Journal of Clinical Oncology
Journal of Oncology Practice

References

External links

Oncology journals
Biomedical informatics journals
Delayed open access journals
English-language journals
Publications established in 2017
Continuous journals
Hybrid open access journals